Jimmy Merchant (born February 10, 1940) is an American singer and musician. He was a member of the doo-wop group The Teenagers. He was inducted into the Rock and Roll Hall of Fame in 1993 as a member of the Teenagers. He retired from The Teenagers in 2005.

Early life and career
Merchant was born on February 10, 1940, in New York City, U.S. In 1950, while attending Edward W. Stitt Junior High School, he met Sherman Garnes and formed The Earth Angels. then they formed The Coupe De Villes and Herman Santiago and Joe Negroni joined the group, Frankie Lymon watched the show before joining the group, They were evolved to The Ermines and The Premiers before renaming themselves The Teenagers, The song "Why Do Fools Fall in Love" was released in 1955. In 1956, Lymon left the group while Billy Lobrano join the band in 1957, after they have success with Lobrano, he left in 1958. Sherman Garnes died in 1977, and Joe Negroni died in 1978, Lewis Lymon (formerly of Lewis Lymon & The Teenchords) join the group while Pearl McKinnon (formerly of The Kodaks) join the group and Bobby Jay also join the group and Eric Ward also joins the group. Jimmy Castor join as the lead singer before he left and was replaced by Timothy Wilson (formerly of Tiny Tim & the Hits), Thomas Lockhart join the group as well, He retired in 2005, but teamed up again with Herman Santiago in 2008. They were known as Frankie Lymon's Teenagers or The Legendary Teenagers.

In 1997, Jimmy joined The Royal All Stars (Doo Wop All Stars). He took the place of BJ Jones, from the Dubs and along with Vito Balsamo from Vito and the Salutations, Artie Loria from The Earls, Randy Silverman from The Impalas and Eugene Pitt from the Jive Five, they became a mainstay in the "doo wop" circuit and toured relentlessly in the following years. Jimmy arranged  a lot of the vocal harmonies for the group. The group performed and toured all over the country bringing the show to countless numbers of doo wop / oldies fans. Jimmy remained in the Doo Wop All Stars for 2 years, until he returned to The Teenagers.

References 

The Teenagers members
1940 births
Living people
Singers from New York City